This is an incomplete list of Carnegie libraries in Europe.

Belgium 

A Carnegie library was built in the 1920s for the University of Leuven to replace a building destroyed in the First World War.

Funding came from the Carnegie Endowment for International Peace, which also built libraries in the war-damaged cities of Rheims and Belgrade.
The architect of the Leuven library was Whitney Warren. Although the architect was American, he employed a Flemish style for this commission. His building in turn suffered severe damage in the Second World War, but has been restored. (For more details of this library, see Catholic University of Leuven.)

France 
The Carnegie library of Reims is the single Carnegie library in France.  Reims was devastated in the First World War and the losses included library accommodation in the town-hall.  The provision of a new library was conceived as a contribution to the city's reconstruction.  Reims was one of three "front-line" cities to be given a Carnegie library, the other two being Leuven and Belgrade.

The Art Deco building was finished in 1927, and opened the following year in the presence of Gaston Doumergue, the French President and Myron T. Herrick, the US ambassador.  The building was restored at the beginning of the 21st century.  The library stock includes some material which survived World War I.

Ireland 

Carnegie libraries are to be found throughout Ireland. Libraries vary considerably in size, some of the rural ones being very small, but the smallest must be the cabinets used for the Carnegie Library Lighthouse Service. 80 were constructed originally and 62 survive in their current form as of 2020 although some no longer function as libraries.

A full list and description of Carnegie libraries in Ireland is in Irish Carnegie Libraries: a Catalogue & Architectural History.  The examples listed below are in the Republic of Ireland.

Cork
 Anglesea Street, Cork, foundation stone laid 1903; destroyed in the Burning of Cork
 Ashe Street, Youghal, County Cork - former Quaker meeting house
 Millstreet, County Cork

Dublin

 Balbriggan, County Dublin (1905)
 Ballsbridge, Dublin (1929)
 Ballyboden, County Dublin (1911)
 Blackrock, Dublin
 Cabinteely
 Clondalkin, County Dublin
 Dalkey, County Dublin
 Dublin City, Charleville Mall, North Strand
 Churchtown Road, Dundrum, Dublin, still in use as a library
 Dún Laoghaire, County Dublin
 Garristown (1912)
 Glencullen, Dún Laoghaire–Rathdown, 1907
 Lusk, Dublin (1908)
 Malahide (1909)
 Pearse Street, Dublin City Public Libraries and Archive
 Pembroke, Anglesea Road (1929)
 Rathmines (1913)
 Sandyford
 Shankill (1912, R.M Butler)
 Skerries, Dublin, Strand street. 1911, still in use as a library
 Swords, Dublin (1908)

Kerry
 Caherciveen
 Castleisland
 Dingle, County Kerry
 Kenmare, County Kerry
 Killorglin, County Kerry, 1909
 Listowel, County Kerry
 Tralee, County Kerry

Kilkenny

 Kilkenny city, John's Quay, 1910, still in use as a library

Limerick
 Athea (1917)
 Askeaton, County Limerick
 Ballyhahill, County Limerick
 Ballysteen, County Limerick
 Broadford, County Limerick
 Clouncagh, County Limerick (1917)
 Croagh
 Feenagh, County Limerick
 Kilcolman
 Kildimo, County Limerick
 Limerick city, 1906 – now the Limerick City Gallery of Art
 Newcastle West, County Limerick
 Pallaskenry, County Limerick
 Rathkeale
 Shanagolden, County Limerick

Louth
 Drogheda

Waterford
 Ballyduff, County Waterford
 Cappoquin, County Waterford
 Lismore, County Waterford, 1910
 Tallow, County Waterford
 Waterford City Library, foundation stone laid 1903 – first Carnegie library in Ireland and still in use

Wicklow
 Bray, County Wicklow
 Enniskerry
 Greystones

Netherlands 

The Peace Palace Library in The Hague is a library in The Hague. A financial donation by Andrew Carnegie made the construction of the Peace Palace possible.

Serbia 
The Belgrade University Library, Serbia, is a Carnegie library. Much of Belgrade was destroyed in the First World War, and in the 1920s it became one of three "front-line" cities to receive a Carnegie library, the other two being Leuven and Rheims.

United Kingdom 
The first Carnegie library to be built was in Scotland, which was Dunfermline Carnegie Library, Carnegie's birthplace. The English Carnegie libraries began to be built at the beginning of the 20th century. Carnegie, who in his retirement divided his time between the US and Scotland, opened some British libraries personally.

In Britain the process of applying for a Carnegie library was broadly similar to that in the US. It was adapted to British legislation, e.g. the Public Libraries Act, which permitted expenditure from the rates on local libraries. Carnegie assessed applications using criteria which favoured poorer towns, but applicants had to undertake to support their library, providing it with books etc. from the rates.  While most towns were very grateful to receive a grant, Carnegie's project was not without controversy. For example, some people objected to the way in which he had made his money. In the case of Stratford-on-Avon there were objections to the proposed building for conservation reasons, and this resulted in a library which blends into the half-timbered neighbouring buildings.

Most Carnegie libraries served the general population of towns and cities, but he also provided some academic libraries in the UK. (This pattern of town and academic libraries was in line with his policy in the US where he provided a number of college libraries, for example at Tuskegee University.) In Stoke-on-Trent the Carnegie United Kingdom Trust funded a specialist ceramics library. The existence of special collections with catalogues gave scope for the development of interlibrary loans.

From 1913 applications were handled by the Carnegie United Kingdom Trust, based in Carnegie's home town, Dunfermline.  The trust continued to fund libraries after Carnegie's death in 1919, but its priorities shifted to other areas of its charitable work.

Current status of Carnegie libraries 
As at 2011 many of the UK's Carnegie libraries continue to be used for their original purpose.  However, Carnegie libraries are being affected by local authority budget cuts which are reducing the number of public libraries across the country.

Some Carnegie libraries are unprotected by the listing system. Over the years some Carnegie libraries have been demolished, e.g. Grays (details in the list below) 
On the other hand, new uses have been found for other Carnegie libraries, e.g. Pontefract's Carnegie library is now a museum.

England 

 London
Brentford Library 1903, brick and terracotta construction, designed by Nowell Parr, Grade II listed.
Bromley 1908, designed by Evelyn Hellicar (1862–1929), now demolished.
Crofton Park 1905, brick and stone (community run by Eco Communities and Lewisham Borough).
Cubitt Town 1905, brick and stone (Tower Hamlets Council)
Custom House, 1905, brick and stone. Still in use as a public library.
Deptford, 1914, brick and stone (closed 1991, now Lewisham Arthouse artists' studios, public gallery and workshop).
Enfield, 1912, heavily extended to the rear in 2010.
Enfield Highway, 1910. Extended in 1938.
Hanwell designed by T Gibbs Thomas in 1905/06 (run by London Borough of Ealing).
Herne Hill 1906, Grade II listed (closed by London Borough of Lambeth 31 March 2016 due to budget cuts, reopened 2018).
 Homerton 1913, Grade II listed (Chats Palace Arts Centre since 1976)
King's College, London: The Carnegie Collection of British Music on loan to The Maughan Library.
Kingston upon Thames 1903, Carnegie also funded the separate building for the Kingston Museum 1904.
Lea Bridge Road, Leyton.
Manor Park, 1905, brick and stone (library relocated 2012–2013).
New Cross, 1911, brick and stone, designed by Gerald Warren & Stanley E Castle (now Music Room studios)
Sydenham (run by London Borough of Lewisham).
Teddington 1906, brick and stone construction.
 Thornton Heath.
Twickenham 1906/7.
Walthamstow 1907–09.
 Birmingham.
Aston Cross, 1903.
Bartley Green 1905.
Birchfield, extension 1904.
Erdington 1907.
King's Heath 1905, Renaissance classical style with art nouveau features Grade II listed.
King's Norton 1906.
Northfield Library 1906, destroyed by fire in 1914, reputedly the work of suffragettes, rebuilt using original facade.
Rednal 1909.
Selly Oak Library 1906.
Stirchley 1907.
 Coventry
 Earlsdon Library 1913.
 Foleshill Library 1913, extended 2008.
 Stoke Library 1913.
 Greater Manchester
 Castleton, Rochdale 1905
 Chorlton, Greater Manchester.
 Didsbury 1915.
 Eccles 1907.
 Levenshulme 1904.
 Milnrow, Greater Manchester.
 Stockport 1913, brick and stone construction. In control of Stockport Metropolitan Borough Council, still in use as Central Library.
 Pemberton 1907, Ormskirk Road, Pemberton, Grade II listed. Library now closed, used as office space.
 Accrington Library 1907 (run by Lancashire County Council).
 Almondbury 1906 (Kirklees)
 Annfield Plain 1908 (run by Durham County Council).
 Arnold, Nottinghamshire 1906, (demolished in the 1980s)
 Ashby (now part of Scunthorpe). Opened in Ashby High Street in April 1906. Built with a grant of £1,500.
 Ashton-in-Makerfield 1906, Grade II listed in 2009.
 Barrow in Furness 1922 (run by Cumbria County Council).
 Batley 1907.
 Bideford 1905.
 Birkenhead, demolished.
 Blackheath, opened 15 November 1909, Grade II listed. Closed in 2011 and now a children's daycare centre.
 Blackpool 1911, Grade II listed.
 Brierley Hill, 1904, Designed by the borough surveyor to Brierley Hill, Lewis Harper and built by CA Horton.
 Bolton on Dearne 1903, brick. One of the first Carnegie libraries outside Scotland. Formerly Council Offices, currently disused. Community group attempting to raise funds to restore the building and re-open it as a Fitness/Martial arts/Boxing centre for local youth.
 Boston Opened in West Street in 1904. Built as part of the Municipal Buildings with a grant of £560.
 Bournemouth Four Carnegie Libraries:- 1907 Winton Branch Library, built with £2,000 from the Carnegie fund, opened on 26 October, by Mayor J. A. Parsons, Grade II listed in 1976; 1909 Springbourne Branch Library, built with £2,000 from the Carnegie fund, opened on 27 March, by Mayor G. E. Bridge; 1910 Boscombe Branch Library, built with £4,000 from the Carnegie fund, designed by Mt C. T. Miles, opened on 22 June, by Mayor G. E. Bridge (relocated to new buildings in 1965); 1916 Westbourne Branch Library, built with £2,000 from the Carnegie fund, opened on 13 May, by Mayor H. Robson, Grade II listed in 1976.
 Bridgwater 1905, Edwardian Baroque style, Grade II listed.
 Burnley 1930 (run by Lancashire County Council).
 Calne 1905.
Caversham, Reading 1907.
 Chadderton 1904-05 Former civic library, Jacobean Revival, designed by J Lindsay Grant of Manchester for Chadderton UDC with funding from Andrew Carnegie.Building was vacated for a new 'Civic Hub' in 2010 and now privately owned. Listed as Grade II in 2011.
 Chatham Opened in 1903. Demolished in the 1980s.
 Cleator Moor 1906, grade II listed
 Clitheroe 1905, grade II listed
 Cockermouth.
 Crosby 1905, brick and stone, Grade II Listed (closed by Sefton Metropolitan Borough Council in December 2013 - currently a local charity Regenerus is working to develop it as a Carnegie-Crosby a 3rd space for the community).
 Cradley Heath, built by Rowley Regis Urban District Council, opened 15 November 1909, Grade II Listed
 Dalton-in-Furness 1905.
 Dartford Opened in 1916. Built with a grant of £7,400, Red brick and Bath stone, Grade-II listed in 1975 (run by Kent County Council).
 Darwen 1908, Yorkshire stone.
 Derby, Pear Tree Road.
 Eastbourne Opened in Grove Road in August 1904. Built with a grant of £10,000. Destroyed in an air raid 1943.
 Eastleigh 1935. The building now forms part of The Point theatre and dance studio, the library having relocated.
 Erith 1906, Grade II listed in 1996. Partly occupied, following relocation of the library in 2009.
 Folkestone The existing library in Grace Hill was extended with a grant of £5,000 from Andrew Carnegie and opened in October 1910.
 Farnworth, Bolton Metropolitan Borough, 1911.
 Fenton, Staffordshire 1906, brick and stone construction (run by Stoke-on-Trent City Council) - closed 31 March 2011 due to budget cuts.
 Gainsborough Opened in Cobden Street in October 1905. Built with a grant of £4,000.
 Garston, Liverpool.
 Goole Opened in Carlisle Street in 1905 with a grant of £3,000. Demolished in the 1960s.
 Gorleston-on-Sea Opened on the corner of Baker Street and Lowestoft Road in April 1907 and built with a grant of £2,000. Demolished in 1975.
 Grantham Opened in St Peter's Hill in 1926. Originally built to house the town's library and museum, with partial funding from the Carnegie UK Trust. The library has since been relocated, but the building has continued in use as a museum.
 Gravesend Opened in Windmill Street in 1905. Built with a grant of £6,000. Grade-II listed in 1975 (run by Kent County Council).
 Grays Free Library opened in Orsett Road in 1903. Built with a grant of £3,000. Later demolished. Replaced by Essex County Council cultural centre in 1968, with Library on ground floor (run by Thurrock unitary authority).
 Great Yarmouth Opened April 1905. Built with a grant of £5,000. Damaged in an air raid in 1941 and again in 1942. This library was subsequently demolished.
 Hartlepool was built in 1903. The building was designed by H.C. Crummack, Borough Engineer.The library and adjoining former librarian's house (no. 72 Northgate) is Grade II listed on the National Heritage List for England. 
 Harrogate Opened in Victoria Avenue in 1906. Built with a grant of £7,500. Re-opened in October 2010 following refurbishment (run by North Yorkshire County Council).
 Haslingden (run by Lancashire County Council).
 Hove 1908, Renaissance style faced with stone, Grade II listed.
 Huthwaite opened 1913, now owned by Nottinghamshire County Council and still serving the people of Huthwaite
 Hull Opened in Analby Road in 1905. Built with a grant of £3,000. Grade II listed, now the "Carnegie Heritage Centre".
 Ilkeston.
 Ipswich Opened in Northgate Street in 1924.
 Irchester Opened November 1909. Built with a grant of £1,000.
 Keighley 1904, stone construction (run by Bradford Metropolitan District Council).
 Kendal 1909, stone construction (run by Cumbria County Council)
 Kettering 1904, built with a grant of £8,450, a "jewelled casket of learning" opened by Andrew himself at age 68 years
 King's Lynn library, opened in London Road in 1905 and built with a grant of £5,000.
 Knutsford, red brick and terracotta construction, built in 1904. Now a day nursery.
 Langley, Sandwell, brick and terracotta construction.
 Leicester Opened 1905 by Carnegie in person. Built with a grant of £12,000. Grade II listed.
 Loughborough, Leicestershire built in 1905
 Lincoln Opened in Free School Lane in 1913. Built with a grant of £10,000.
 Littlehampton 30 May 1906. Maltravers Road BN17 5NA. The extended & refurbished modern library is run by West Sussex County Council.
 Lowestoft Opened in Clapham Road in May 1905. Destroyed in an air raid March 1941.
 Luton Opened 1 October 1910. Built with a grant of £12,000. Demolished in 1962.
 Mansfield Opened in Leeming Street in May 1905. Built with a grant of £3,500. Remained a library until 1977, and is currently used as an arts centre.
 Melton Mowbray Opened in Thorpe End in 1905. Built with a grant of £2,000. Used as a public library until 1974; now Melton Carnegie Museum
 Middlesbrough Central library 1912.
 Neston 1907 (run by Cheshire West and Chester Council).
 Newbury Opened in Cheap Street in May 1906, Built with a grant of £2,000. Used as the town's public library until 2000.
 Newcastle upon Tyne Opened in Benwell area in 1909
 Newton-le-Willows 1909, built with a grant of £4,000 (run by St. Helens Metropolitan Borough Council).
 New Mills 1910, built with a grant of £2,000.
 Normanton, West Yorkshire 1907, red brick.
 Northampton Opened in Abington Street in 1910, to a design by Herbert Norman.
 Oswaldtwistle 1915 (run by Lancashire County Council).
 Penistone 1913, (now used as offices for Barnsley Council).
 Pontefract 1904, Art nouveau building which now serves as a museum.
 Portsmouth 1906, Edwardian baroque and free Renaissance style.
 Peterborough Opened officially by Carnegie in Broadway in May 1906. Built with a grant of £6,000. Used as the public library until 1990.
 Ramsgate, Kent 1904
 Rawmarsh 1905
 Rawtenstall
 Royton 1907.
 Runcorn The existing library was altered and extended in 1906 with a grant of £3,000 from Andrew Carnegie. Used as a public library until 2012.
 Rushden Opened in Newton Road in November 1905. Built with a grant of £2,000.
 St Albans Opened in 1911 on Victoria Street.  Librarian - Ernest William Green.  Fine Edwardian Baroque building.  It is now a city centre pub.
 St Annes-on-the-Sea (Lytham St Annes) 1906, brick and terracotta construction (run by Lancashire County Council).
 Sandown Opened in High Street in July 1905. Built with a grant of £2,000 (run by Isle of Wight County Council, threatened with closure).
 Scunthorpe Opened in Station Road (now High Street East) in February 1904. Used as a public library until 1974. Demolished c.1985.
 Sefton Park, Liverpool 1911. Mock Tudor style building with a modern 1960s extension.
 Sevenoaks Opened in The Drive in November 1905. Built with a grant of £3,000. Used as a public library until 1986.
 Shipley, West Yorkshire 1905, stone construction. The building is no longer in use as a library.
 Skipton, North Yorkshire, North Yorkshire 1910 operated by Craven District Council 
 Solon Carnegie Library, no building provided. This academic library comprised books on ceramics. The collection is now in the Horace Barks Reference Library, Stoke-on-Trent.
 Southend-on-Sea, 1905, Public Library designed by Henry Hare. Since 1981, the building has been in use as the Central Museum, Southend.
 Sowerby Bridge (Near Halifax) 1905, stone (run by Calderdale MBC)
 Stamford, Lincolnshire Opened in High Street in 1906. Building converted for library use with a grant of £2,500. Grade II listed.
 Stapleford, Nottinghamshire 1906. Used as a public library until replacement by modern premises in 1981. Then fell into disrepair until purchased by Stapleford Town Council in 1987 and subsequently renovated and re-opened in 1988 as The Carnegie Centre. Now home to Stapleford Town Council. In use as library during 2013 as the 1981 library is refurbished.
 Stourbridge, 1904, Grade II Listed
 Stratford-upon-Avon, partly timber construction.
 Sunderland - Hendon 1908, Kayll Road 1909, Monkwearmouth 1909
 Taunton, Opened 1905, closed in 1996 and is now a wine bar.
Tinsley Carnegie Library, opened in June 1905, a few months before Sheffield's more well known Carnegie library at Walkley, and seven years before Tinsley became part of Sheffield. It served as the branch library until 1985 when the service moved to a new building. </ref>
 Tividale, opened 15 November 1909, closed 1966.
 Tuebrook, Liverpool. Closed in 2006 due to health and safety concerns. Now being redeveloped as a community hub by local charity Lister Steps.
 Tyldesley 1909, brick and stone construction.
 Walkley, Sheffield 1905, Grade II listed.
 Wallasey Central Library.
 Walsall Central Library, of red brick and stone. Opened 24 July 1906 at a cost of £8,000.
 Wakefield 1905, stone. Library now closed, replaced by a new library and museum within the Wakefield One Civic office building which opened to the public on Monday 29 October 2012, with the lending library on the upper ground floor and local studies section and museum on the lower ground floor. The building was converted by The Art House in 2014 into 34 artists' studios.
 Wednesbury 1908, red brick and limestone at a cost of £5,000.
 West Bromwich 1907, Ruabon facing bricks with Portland stone and terracotta detailing.
 Westhoughton 1906, situated at the rear of the Town Hall.
 Workington 1904, built as a library and lecture hall. In use as a theatre & arts centre since 1973
 Worthing 1908. Built by Worthing Corporation, the building survives as Worthing Museum & Art Gallery. Today's library was built next door, opened in 1975 and is run by West Sussex County Council.

Scotland 

In Scotland the Carnegie libraries were typically built of stone. In the rest of the British Isles there was much more use of brick.  The drawings of the Carnegie libraries designed by architect James Robert Rhind are in the Strathclyde Archives, Glasgow.

 Aberdeen Central Library 1892
 Airdrie Public Library 1894 and 1925
 Arthurstone Library, Dundee 1905 - still in use as a library
 Carnegie Library, Ayr 1893
 Blackness Library, Dundee - still in use as a library
 Bridgeton District Library, 1903 by architect James Robert Rhind (now used as Glasgow Women's Library)
 Broughty Ferry Library, Dundee - still in use as a library
 Bo'ness
 Burntisland
Castle Douglas Library 1904 by architect George Washington Browne.
 Bonnyrigg
 Coatbridge library 1905 pink sandstone construction
Coldside Library, Dundee 1908 - still in use as a library
 Dennistoun Library, 1905 by architect James Robert Rhind
 Ewart Library, Dumfries, named at Carnegie's suggestion after William Ewart, MP for Dumfries Burghs 1841–1868, in 1850 he carried a bill for establishing free libraries supported out of public rates.
 Dunfermline Carnegie Library, Dunfermline, 1883, the first Carnegie library
 Edinburgh, Central Lending Library 1890, French Renaissance style, by George Washington Browne.
Fraserburgh
 Govanhill & Crosshill District Library, 1906 by architect James Robert Rhind
 Grangemouth 1889, the second Carnegie library (which opened shortly before Braddock, the first Carnegie library in the US)
 Hamilton townhouse library 1907
 Hawick Library 1904
 Hugh Miller Institute, Cromarty, 1902 by architect Alexander Ross, named after local geologist and writer Hugh Miller.
 Hutchesontown District Library, 1904 by architect James Robert Rhind
 Inverurie Public Library, August 1911 by architect Harbourne Maclennan
Iona, 1911.
 Kirkwall 1909, no longer in use as a library.
 Jedburgh Library - there were two and the replacement opened nearby. Now under threat
 Kinross
 Kingston District Library, Paisley Road 1904 originally shared with the Kingston Halls and the local police station, is now a doss house 
 Maryhill Public Library, 1903 by architect James Robert Rhind
 Maxton, Roxburghshire (Now used as a village hall).
 Maybole
 Montrose, Angus
 Motherwell
 Parkhead District Library, 1906 by architect James Robert Rhind
Reading Rooms Dundee (previously Blackscroft Library), 1910 by architect James Thomson
 Stirling Central Library, 1902 by architect Harry Ramsay Taylor
 Tain, Highland
 Thurso, Highland 1910, by architect Sinclair MacDonald
 Wick, Highland 1897
 West Calder 1904
 Woodside Library, 1905 by architect James Robert Rhind

Wales 
Carnegie's libraries were not exclusively for English-speakers. The Bangor library was called Llyfrgell Rydd ("Free Library" in Welsh).

 Abercanaid 1903, demolished
 Abergavenny 1906, Grade II listed (CADW 2886)
 Aberystwyth 1906
 Bangor 1907, brick and stone construction
 Barry 1906 (opened on St David's day by the Earl of Plymouth)
 Bridgend - former Old Library 1906 now Carnegie House (2014), Council Offices and Arts/Culture Hub
 Brynmawr 1905 - now a museum  
 Buckley 1904 - now Buckley Town Council offices
 Canton, Cardiff 1907
 Cathays, Cardiff 1907
 Church Village (Llantwit Fardre) 1906 - now the Parish Hall  
 Coedpoeth 1904, local sandstone construction
 Colwyn Bay 1905
 Criccieth 1905 (opened on St David's day by JE Greaves, lord lieutenant of Caernarfonshire)
 Deiniolen 1913
 Dolgellau 1913
 Dowlais, Merthyr Tydfil 1907
 Flint 1903 
 Llandrindod Wells 1912 - now the Radnorshire museum 
 Llandudno 1910
 Merthyr Tydfil 1935
 Newport: Rogerstone Library 1905, and Corporation Road Library, Newport 1904
 Penarth 1905  
 Penydarren 1902
 Pontypool 1908 
 Rhyl, Flintshire (now Denbighshire) 1907 no longer in use as a library. Makes up part of the town hall and is used for the registration of births, deaths and marriages.
 Skewen 1905  
 Taibach, Neath Port Talbot 1914
 Trecynon, opened 1903
 Treharris 1909
 Whitchurch, Cardiff 1904
 Wrexham 1907

Northern Ireland 
 Bangor, County Down, extended, but still in use as a library.
 Belfast, Falls Road still in use as a library.
 Belfast, Donegall Road
 Belfast, Oldpark Road no longer in use
 Derry - proposed but never constructed
 Downpatrick, County Down – demolished to allow for road improvements
 Portadown, County Armagh – no longer in use as a library
 Lurgan, County Armagh, 1906 – still in use as a library.
 Larne, County Antrim, 1905 - now Larne Museum and Arts Centre.

References 

Europe
Europe-related lists
Libraries in Europe